Sagittarius is the name of different fictional characters appearing in American comic books published by Marvel Comics.

Publication history
The original Sagittarius first appeared in Avengers #72 (January 1970), and was created by Roy Thomas and Sal Buscema.

Fictional character biography

Harlan Vargas

Harlan Vargas is a founding member of the Zodiac, and his base of operations was Washington, D.C. The Zodiac Cartel was founded by Cornelius van Lunt (Taurus), handpicking the eleven other members; van Lunt concealed his own identity, while he was the only one who knew the identities of the others. Each member was based in a different American city as part of his nationwide criminal network, with the ultimate goal of world economic and political domination.

The Zodiac was infiltrated by Nick Fury, posing as Scorpio; the Zodiac fought the Avengers and escaped. Aquarius, Capricorn, and Sagittarius sought to recapture the Zodiac Key, but lost it to the Brotherhood of the Ankh.

Led by Taurus, the Zodiac later attempted to kill all Manhattan residents born under the sign of Gemini as a show of power, but were thwarted by the Avengers. Taurus's faction attempted to kill the Zodiac dissident faction, but all twelve leaders were captured by the Avengers.

A new android version of the Zodiac later appeared, led by Scorpio in a new android body, massacred the human Zodiac, and took over their criminal operations.

Life Model Decoy
An android Sagittarius was a Life Model Decoy created by Scorpio (Jacob Fury) in his "Theatre Of Genetics" to be part of his Zodiac crime organization. Scorpio went after his brother, Nick Fury, with his new group, but was defeated by Defenders and Moon Knight. The androids Libra and Sagittarius employed costumed criminals posing as the Defenders to create chaos in New York City. The Zodiac LMD's were recruited by Quicksilver during his bout with temporary insanity, and Quicksilver ordered the Zodiac LMD's to destroy Avengers for their imagined wrongdoings. The Avengers managed to defeat the group and most were remanded into federal custody.

The android Zodiac were soon released, and the Scorpio LMD rebuilt a number of them. Scorpio used the Zodiac Key to create LMDs that exemplified the forces and personalities inherent in each sign, hoping to create great strength in the combination of all twelve traits of the Zodiac. He arranged the ambush in which the android Zodiac killed all of the remaining human Zodiac leaders except Cornelius van Lunt, alias Taurus. It was later revealed the Libra had also survived the attack on the original Zodiac Cartel. Immediately afterward, Van Lunt sought out the services of the Avengers' West Coast branch to confront and defeat the android Zodiac. He was destroyed by Hawkeye in a battle with the West Coast Avengers.

Second Life Model Decoy
This Sagittarius was created by Scorpio after the first Sagittarius LMD was destroyed by Hawkeye in a battle with the West Coast Avengers. This version of Sagittarius, was created to look exactly like Hawkeye to infiltrate the West Coast Avengers compound.

It was soon discovered by Mockingbird and, with the help of the Leo LMD created to appear exactly as Tigra also to infiltrate the West Coast Avengers, destroyed.

Ecliptic Sagittarius
Ecliptic Sagittarius is one of the first recruits in the latest incarnation of the Zodiac. Recruited by their leader Scorpio, Sagittarius was a bow-wielding centaur and has demonstrated a tendency towards violent acts, for which he apparently feels no remorse. He apparently had a relationship with fellow member Pisces. Sagittarius was apparently killed by Weapon X.

Thanos' Sagittarius
The fifth Sagittarius is an unnamed man who Thanos recruited to join his incarnation of the Zodiac. He and the other Zodiac members perish when Thanos abandons them on the self-destructing Helicarrier where Cancer was the only survivor.

Powers and abilities
Sagittarius has no powers. However, he is skilled at hand-to-hand combat.

The android Sagittarius is equipped with special wrist-launchers which can fire arrows at its opponents, including flame-arrows. In its second form, Sagittarius was constructed to resemble Hawkeye. It carries a bow and arrows similar to Hawkeye.

Ecliptic's Sagittarius had a bow that shot armor-piercing arrows. He sometimes carries a gun and has a Zodiac teleportation device.

In other media
 Sagittarius appears in The Avengers: United They Stand as a cyborg, centaur-like alien and member of Zodiac.
 Sagittarius appears in Marvel Anime: Iron Man as a centaur-like mech utilized by Zodiac. In the episode "A Duel of Iron", it attacks Iron Man so Ho Yinsen can steal plutonium for Zodiac. In the episode "Casualties of War", Yinsen sends the Sagittarius mech to attack Tony Stark and Nagato Sakurai upon learning the former survived an attempt on his life. However, the mech is destroyed by Iron Man.

References

External links
 
 

Characters created by Roy Thomas
Characters created by Sal Buscema
Comics characters introduced in 1970
Fictional characters from Washington, D.C.
Marvel Comics supervillains